The 1992 CONMEBOL Pre-Olympic Tournament began on 31 January 1992, and is the 9th CONMEBOL Pre-Olympic Tournament. This was the 1st tournament is open to players under the age of 23 without any other restriction. There is no qualification stage and all 10 member of CONMEBOL automatic qualified. The winner and the runner-up qualified for 1992 Summer Olympics. Players born on or after 1 January 1969 were eligible to play in this competition.

Squads

Group stage

Group A

Group B

Final round

References

External links
Statistics of Pre-Olímpico 1992 
Olympic qualifying 1992 South America
CONMEBOL

1992
1992
Olym
Oly